Legutio (also known as Legutiano; Villarreal de Álava in Spanish) is a town and municipality located in the province of Álava, in the Basque Country, northern Spain.

References

External links

Municipalities in Álava